A cold trap is a concept in planetary sciences that describes an area cold enough to freeze (trap) volatiles. Cold-traps can exist on the surfaces of airless bodies or in the upper layers of an adiabatic atmosphere. On airless bodies, the ices trapped inside cold-traps can potentially remain there for geologic time periods, allowing us a glimpse into the primordial solar system. In adiabatic atmospheres, cold-traps prevent volatiles (such as water) from escaping the atmosphere into space.

Cold-traps on airless planetary bodies 

The obliquity (axial tilt) of some airless planetary bodies in the Solar System such as Mercury, the Moon and Ceres is very close to zero. Harold Urey first noted that depressions or craters located near the poles of these bodies will cast persistent shadows that can survive for geologic time periods (millions–billions of years). The absence of an atmosphere prevents mixing by convection, rendering these shadows extremely cold. If molecules of volatiles such as water ice travel into these permanent shadows, they will become trapped for geologic time periods.

Studying cold-traps on airless bodies 
As these shadows receive no insolation, most of the heat they receive is scattered and emitted radiation from the surrounding topography. Usually, horizontal heat conduction from adjacent warmer areas can be neglected due to the high porosity and therefore low thermal conductivity of the uppermost layers of airless bodies. Consequently, the temperatures of these permanent shadows can be modeled using ray casting or ray tracing algorithms coupled with 1D vertical heat conduction models. In some cases, such as bowl-shaped craters, it is possible to obtain an expression for the equilibrium temperature of these shadows.

Additionally, the temperatures (and therefore the stability) of cold-traps can be remotely sensed by an orbiter. The temperatures of lunar cold-traps have been extensively studied by the Lunar Reconnaissance Orbiter Diviner radiometer. On Mercury, evidence for ice deposits inside cold-traps has been obtained through radar, reflectance and visible imagery. On Ceres, cold-traps have been detected by the Dawn spacecraft.

Atmospheric Cold-traps 
In atmospheric science, a cold-trap is a layer of the atmosphere that is substantially colder than both the deeper and higher layers. For example, for Earth's troposphere, the temperature of the air drops with increasing height reaching a low point (at about 20 kilometers height). This region is called a cold-trap, because it traps ascending gases with high melting points, forcing them to drop back into Earth.

For humans, the most important gas to be kept in that way is water vapor. Without the presence of a cold-trap in the atmosphere, the water content would gradually escape into space, making life impossible. The cold trap retains one-tenth of a percent of the water in the atmosphere in the form of a vapor at high altitudes.  Earth's cold-trap is also a layer which above ultraviolet intensity is strong, since higher up the amount of water vapor is negligible.  Oxygen screens out ultraviolet intensity.

Some astronomers believe that the lack of a cold trap is why the planets Venus and Mars both lost most of their liquid water early in their histories. The Earth's cold trap is located about 12 km above sea level, well below the height in which water vapor would be permanently split apart into hydrogen and oxygen by solar UV rays and the former irreversibly being lost to space. Because of the cold trap in the Earth's atmosphere, the Earth is actually losing water to space at a rate of only 1 millimeter of ocean every 1 million years, which is too slow to affect changes in sea levels on any timescales relevant to humans, compared to the current rate of sea level rise at a rate of 3 millimeters every single year due to ongoing human-caused climate change melting the polar ice caps combined with thermal expansion of seawater (this is why, as pointed out by Peter Ward and Donald Brownlee in their book The Life and Death of Planet Earth, the current process of the actual loss of oceans was only documented twice, first during the Apollo 16 Moon mission, although by accident, which involved the mission's astronauts observing Earth via a unique  Carruthers camera that was both created and used only once, for that particular mission, as such process can only be viewed under UV light and from the Moon, due to it lacking an atmosphere to block out said UV light), and again during the 1990s via studies from astronauts taken while aboard the Space Shuttle, and at that rate it would take trillions of years, far longer than its life expectancy, for all of its water to disappear (this is also why due to human-caused climate change extreme weather events like hurricanes and floods will intensify in the near term, as a warmer atmosphere can hold more moisture, and therefore increase the amount of said water vapor returning as precipitation, as even then the cold trap will still prevent said water vapor from being lost to space, and therefore Earth's atmosphere is still too cold for such to happen), although the eventual warming of the Sun as it ages will only make the cold trap weaker over the next billion years by making the Earth's atmosphere even warmer, which pushes the cold trap even higher into the atmosphere, and therefore causing it to lose the ability to prevent any water vapor from being dissociated back into hydrogen and oxygen by the Sun's UV rays and the former escaping into space, leading to the Earth ultimately losing its oceans to space in about 1 billion years' time, long before the Sun finally expands into a red giant.

Cold traps are thought to function for oxygen on Ganymede.

References

Atmosphere